Chaplin Reserve was an Australian football (soccer) stadium in Sunshine, a suburb of Melbourne, Victoria. It was the home of Sunshine George Cross from 1980 to 2017, buying the facility from the State Government in 1997. The stadium had a capacity of 5,000. Chaplin Reserve was also home to the Sunshine George Cross Bocci Club.  
The state government sold the land to the soccer club about 20 years ago on the condition that it was only used for the purpose of a private sports ground.

Despite the reserve being sold to George Cross on the condition that it was only used for the purpose of a private sports ground, George Cross sold the reserve to developers in 2016, who intend to build 150 townhouses on the site, despite angry objections by Sunshine residents. The soccer club will move to a new council facility in Taylors Hill, Victoria, worth $13m.

External links
Sunshine George Cross FC

Soccer venues in Melbourne
Sports venues in Melbourne
Sunshine, Victoria
Sport in the City of Brimbank
Buildings and structures in the City of Brimbank